Erskine Academy is a private high school located in South China, Maine that serves eight surrounding towns.
The school's motto is "Mens Sana in Corpore Sano" (A Healthy Mind In A Healthy Body). Erskine Academy's school colors are blue and white, and an eagle is the school's mascot.

History
Erskine was founded as a result of a trust established following the passing of Sullivan Erskine in 1880. John K. Erskine, a nephew of Sullivan, asked Mary Erskine to bequest a portion of the money to the town of China to be placed in some reliable trust, the annual interest to be used to support and control a high school for the town. This school was to be located in school district No. 14.

In this, John Erskine saw a chance by which his dream of a life-time might be realized. In his own youth he had been denied the privilege of a high school education, and he made up his mind that if opportunity ever came his way he would see that the younger generation had this chance. Mr. Erskine went about his work so quietly and yet so openly that even his closest friends and associates did not realize his great influence and interest in the business at hand.

A body of trustees was established and they went to Augusta, and proceeded to enlist the services of attorneys, Samuel Titcomb, W.S. Choate and Mr. Boardman, editor of the Maine Farmer. These in consultation, drew up a deed of trust that established the school. This being done, the trustees met and organized, choosing Eli Jones, president; J.K. Erskine, vice-president; Dana C. Hanson, secretary, and Samuel C. Starrett, treasurer.  The school then secured a building from an old Methodist Church and opened in 1883.
Tuition at Erskne Academy is $12,650 a year for non boarding students and $13,650 boarding.

Faculty
Headmaster: Mike McQuarrie
Associate Headmaster: Jamie Soule
Assistant Headmaster: John Clark
Guidance Director: Susan LaGasse
Athletic Director: Chuck Karter
Business Manager: Cheryl York

Towns
Erskine Academy serves the following towns: Chelsea, China, Jefferson, Palermo, Somerville, Vassalboro, Whitefield, Windsor.

Academic departments
Music Department - The music department consists of one instructor, Jim Johnson.  He is aided by his wife, Bridget Convey. She accompanies the Chorus. There are 4 performing Ensembles: Concert Band, Jazz Combo (Audition Required), Percussion Explosion (Teacher Permission Required), and Chorus.  There is 1 class: Music Lab. 
Theatre Department - The drama department consists of two classes taught by Ryan Nored. The classes are Introduction to Drama and Advanced Drama. Advanced Drama students must have taken Introduction to Drama or have been a member of the EA Theatre Club.
English Department - The English Department is a busy department because students need to take four English classes in order to graduate.  A.P. Literature and Composition and A.P. Language and Composition are offered.
Math Department - Students need to take three math classes to graduate.   A.P. Calculus and A.P. Statistics are offered.
Science Department - Students need to take three science classes to graduate.  A.P. Biology, AP Chemistry, and AP Physics are sometimes offered.
Language Department - Students need to take two language classes to graduate.  EA offers Spanish, French, Chinese, Russian, German, Latin, and in the past has offered Italian after school. A.P. Spanish is sometimes offered.
History Department - Students need to take three history classes to graduate.  A.P. U.S. History is offered.

Extracurricular activities
AFS - American Field Services helps sponsor students from other countries to come to EA and students from EA to travel to other countries.  Normally, they hold several fundraisers throughout the year.  Traditional activities are the AFS Slammer at homecoming, volunteering at the Common Ground Fair, a yearly trip to Quebec, Canada, and several meetings throughout the year which normally have a guest speaker discussing the culture of another area of the world.  This year several members are traveling to El Salvador to do volunteer work.  Sonia Stevenson is this group's advisor.
Amnesty International - AI is a fairly new group at Erskine.  It was started during the '07-'08 school year.  This group has urged students to sign petitions to make their voices heard and spread knowledge of human rights.  Several meetings are held throughout the year where the group may watch movies, make T-shirts, or learn about the problems in the world and what we can do to help solve them.  Ryan Nored is this group's advisor.
Art & Lit - Art & Lit gathers several short pieces of writing and drawings or pieces of art and publishes a yearly magazine near the end of the school year.  Emily Foss and Mary Oches are this group's advisors.
Business Club - The Business Club runs many events throughout the school year such as a dunk tank, school dances, volunteer activities, and has gone on trips to Florida and New York in the past.  Roxanne Malley is this group's advisor.
Chess Club - The Chess Club holds several meeting throughout the school year where students are encouraged to come learn and practice the game of chess.  In the past they have participated in state competitions.  Bill Childs is this group's advisor.
Destination Imagination - DI is a group that encourages students to use their mind to come up with creative ways to solve issues.  Sometimes machines are built and sometimes skits are done.  The idea is to learn what one can do with a very limited budget.  This group participates in several competitions on the regional and state level.  Abby Everleth is this group's advisor.
Math Team - The Math Team meets and practices their math skills throughout the school year.  Historically this team has done a tremendous job taking home many first, second, and third place wins on the individual and team level.  They are a team to be rivaled at state competitions.  Armed with their TI-83s and TI-84s and with Lew Purinton as their advisor, these students impress everyone with their number skills.
Model State - Model State or Youth in Government (some states call it Youth and Government) is a group in which students get first hand legislature experience.  These students write bills and run for positions.  The students spend a weekend in May at the State House in Augusta.  Here they try to argue for their bills and vote on important issues.  Positions that Erskine Academy students have held in the past are lobbyist, member of the House of Representatives, member of the Senate, House chair for numerous committees, Senate Chair for numerous committees, Secretary of the Senate, Clerk of the House, and even Speaker of the House.  Lori Dube is this group's advisor.
National Art Honor Society - NAHS is a national group that only allows certain, very talented artists in.  Students must collaborate a portfolio of art which is then judged in order to be allowed in.  Emily Foss is this group's advisor.
National Honor Society - NHS is a prestigious group that chooses students who have been highly involved in the school and community while maintaining an impressive GPA.  Students are inducted during their junior or senior year.  NHS sponsors a dance, decorates the school for the holiday season, and sells flowers during the school year.  Mary Oches is this group's advisor.
Pep Band - Pep Band practices throughout the school year and plays during home varsity basketball games in the winter. This group is student-led; it has student conductors that conduct and lead the group. Kelly Clark and Roxanne Malley are this group's advisors.
Prom Committee - The Prom Committee is made up of juniors who plan the year's prom during May.  Kelly Potter is this group's advisor.
Ski/Outing Club - The Ski and Outing Club travels to the mountains as many times as the weather permits during the winter.  Dennis Scates is this group's advisor.
Speech and Debate - This team goes to several meets during the winter and spring.  They have done very, very well in the past. Rod Robilliard is this group's advisor.
Student Council - The Student Council is composed of four students elected by the peers from each class.  The class presidents are also on student council.  They run dances and attend conferences.  They do many things for the school and student body, especially during winter carnival.  They have also won the Spirit Cup for many, many years.  Mary MacFarland is this group's advisor.
EA Theatre Club - Every December or January the members of the drama club perform a three-act play. Every March the members participate in the Maine One Act Festival sponsored by the Maine Principals' Association. They have had success numerous times at the regional competitions, earning the right to move onto the state level. They have won by performing: Impromptu, Childhood (2nd place), Juvie, Competition Piece, and Mother Goose has Flown the Coop. Ryan Nored is this group's advisor/director.
TLC - Teens Leading and Learning through Community Service provides students with opportunities for volunteer service within the local communities.  They may spend time at area nursing homes, share afternoons with young children, or assist at local businesses. Kelly Clark is this group's advisor.
Yearbook - The Yearbook staff work all year round to compile pictures and information for the year's yearbook: The Pinnacle.  They work long hours and sell and distribute the yearbooks at the end of the school year.  Jenny Sutter is this group's adviser.
Physics Club- The physics club at Erskine Academy is club where students can build, program, experience, and learn about physics. The fun part of this club is building robots for the annual competitions like FIRST and VEX. This club adviser is Mr. Choate.

Athletics
Erskine Academy offers several sports, and is a member of the Kennebec Valley Athletic Conference.

Fall Season
 Soccer (Varsity Boys, JV Boys, Freshman Boys, Varsity Girls, and JV Girls teams)
 Cross Country (Boys and Girls teams)
 Field Hockey (Varsity Girls and JV Girls teams)
 Golf (One main team open to boys and girls)
Winter Season
 Basketball (Varsity Boys, JV Boys, Varsity Girls, and JV Girls teams)
 Wrestling (One main team open to boys and girls)
 Cheering (Varsity and JV teams open to boys and girls)
 Indoor Track (Girls and Boys teams- a non-cut sport)
 Swimming (Girls and Boys teams- a non-cut sport)
Spring Season
 Baseball (Varsity and JV teams)
 Lacrosse (Varsity and JV teams)
 Softball (Varsity and JV teams)
 Track and Field (Girls and Boys teams- a non-cut sport)
 Tennis (Varsity Boys and Varsity Girls teams)

Winter Carnival
Every February, Erskine Academy holds its Winter Carnival. It consists of a series of games played during the week before February Vacation. Winning games results in winning points, and when Winter Carnival is over whichever grade (9th, 10th, 11th, 12th) has accumulated the most points wins Winter Carnival. The events in Winter Carnival include skits (performed by each grade), volleyball competitions, egg tosses, paper airplane throwing, push-ups, crunches, mini-golf in the library, log throw, and many more. For winter carnival there are three different main days of competition; Indoor Day, Outdoor Day, and the Assembly.  Although Indoor Day and Outdoor Day are very critical toward earning points, a large portion of the points are earned at the Assembly on the Friday before February vacation. Also, over the year there is a constant competition dealing with the collection of cantabs. These cantabs are donated to the Shriners Hospitals for Children and also benefit the grades by allowing them to win more points.

References

External links
 Official website

Private high schools in Maine
Schools in Kennebec County, Maine